8PB may also refer to:

ABC NewsRadio, in Australia (Frequency callsign 8PB in the Northern Territory)
The Port of Bridgetown (Port callsign 8PB)